Screaming Lord Sutch (10 November 1940 – 16 June 1999), who had his name legally changed from David Edward Sutch, was an English musician and perennial parliamentary candidate. He was the founder of the Official Monster Raving Loony Party and served as its leader from 1983 to 1999, during which time he stood in numerous parliamentary elections. He holds the record for contesting the most Parliamentary elections, standing in 39 elections from 1963 to 1997. As a singer, he variously worked with Keith Moon, Jeff Beck, Jimmy Page, Ritchie Blackmore, Charlie Watts, John Bonham, Noel Redding, Mitch Mitchell and Nicky Hopkins, and is known for his recordings with Joe Meek including "Jack the Ripper" (1963).

Musical career 
Sutch was born at New End Hospital in Hampstead, North London, and grew up in Harrow. In the 1960s, inspired by Screamin' Jay Hawkins, he changed his stage name to "Screaming Lord Sutch, 3rd Earl of Harrow", despite having no connection with the peerage.

After his career as an early 1960s rock and roll attraction, it became customary for the UK press to refer to him as "Screaming Lord Sutch", or simply "Lord Sutch". Early works included recordings produced by audio pioneer Joe Meek.

During the 1960s Screaming Lord Sutch was known for his horror-themed stage show, dressing as Jack the Ripper, pre-dating the shock rock antics of Arthur Brown and Alice Cooper. Accompanied by his band, the Savages, he started by coming out of a black coffin (once being trapped inside of it, an incident parodied in the film Slade in Flame). Other props included knives and daggers, skulls and "bodies". Sutch booked themed tours, such as 'Sutch and the Roman Empire', where Sutch and the band members would be dressed up as Roman soldiers. Fellow musician Chas McDevitt has claimed that he gave the idea for a Screamin' Jay Hawkins-inspired act to Sutch's manager Paul Lincoln after seeing Hawkins perform in New York in 1957, having already considered emulating Hawkins himself by starting his act by emerging from a silk-lined coffin but deciding that he "(didn't have) the personality to carry this off", stating that "no one in this country had heard of Hawkins until the mid-60s".

Despite a self-confessed lack of vocal talent, Sutch released horror-themed singles during the early to mid-1960s, the most popular being "Jack the Ripper", which was covered live and on record by garage rock bands including the White Stripes, the Gruesomes, the Black Lips and the Horrors, the latter for their debut album.

In 1963 Sutch and his manager, Reginald Calvert, took over Shivering Sands Army Fort, a Maunsell Fort off Southend, and in 1964 started Radio Sutch, intending to compete with other pirate radio stations such as Radio Caroline. Broadcasts consisted of music and Mandy Rice-Davies reading Lady Chatterley's Lover. Sutch tired of the station, and sold it to Calvert, after which it was renamed Radio City, and lasted until 1967. In 1966 Calvert was shot dead by Oliver Smedley over a financial dispute. Smedley was acquitted on grounds of self-defence. About this time Ritchie Blackmore left the band. Roger Warwick left to set up an R&B big band for Freddie Mack.

Sutch's album Lord Sutch and Heavy Friends was named in a 1998 BBC poll as the worst album of all time, a status it also held in Colin Larkin's book The Top 1000 Albums of All Time, despite the fact that Jimmy Page, John Bonham, Jeff Beck, Noel Redding and Nicky Hopkins performed on it and helped write it. 

For his follow-up, Hands of Jack the Ripper, Sutch assembled British rock celebrities for a concert at the Carshalton Park Rock 'n' Roll Festival. The show was recorded (though only Sutch knew), and it was released to the surprise of the musicians. Musicians on the record included Ritchie Blackmore (guitar); Matthew Fisher (keyboard); Carlo Little (drums); Keith Moon (drums); Noel Redding (bass) and Nick Simper (bass).

In 2017 his song "Flashing Lights" was featured in Logan Lucky, directed by Steven Soderbergh.

Political activities 
In the 1960s Sutch stood in parliamentary elections, often as representative of the National Teenage Party. His first was in 1963, when he contested the by-election in Stratford-upon-Avon caused by the resignation of John Profumo. He gained 208 votes. His next was at the 1966 general election when he stood in Harold Wilson's Huyton constituency. Here he received 585 votes.

He founded the Official Monster Raving Loony Party on 16 June 1982 at the Golden Lion Hotel in Ashburton, Devon, and fought the 1983 Bermondsey by-election. In his career he contested over 40 elections. He was recognisable at election counts by his flamboyant clothes and top hat. In 1968 he officially added "lord" to his name by deed poll. In the mid 1980s, the deposit paid by candidates was raised from £150 to £500. This did little to deter Sutch, who increased the number of concerts he performed to pay for campaigns.  He achieved his highest poll and vote share at Rotherham in 1994 with 1,114 votes and a 4.2 per cent vote share.

At the Bootle by-election in May 1990, he secured more votes than the candidate of the Continuing Social Democratic Party (SDP), led by former Foreign Secretary David Owen. Within days the SDP dissolved itself. In 1993, when the British National Party gained its first local councillor, Derek Beackon, Sutch pointed out that the Official Monster Raving Loony Party already had six. He contested 39 parliamentary elections – a record number – losing his deposit in all of them.

He appeared as himself in the first episode of ITV comedy The New Statesman, coming second ahead of the Labour and SDP, in the 1987 election which saw Alan B'Stard elected to Parliament.

Adverts in the 1990s for Heineken Pilsener boasted that "Only Heineken can do this". One had Sutch at 10 Downing Street after becoming Prime Minister.

Sutch pulled out of the 1997 general election to take care of his sick mother in South Harrow. Later that year he contested his last two by-elections, in Uxbridge and Winchester.

In 1999 Sutch starred in a Coco Pops advert as a returning officer announcing the results of its renaming competition.

Personal life 
Sutch was friends with, and at one time lived at the house of, Cynthia Payne.

He had a history of depression, and killed himself by hanging on 16 June 1999 at his late mother's house. At the inquest, his fiancée Yvonne Elwood said he had manic depression, now known as bipolar disorder.

Sutch is buried beside his mother, who died on 30 April 1997, in Pinner New Cemetery (Section J2, Grave 27), Middlesex. He is survived by a son, Tristan Lord Gwynne Sutch, born in 1975 to American model Thann Rendessy.

In 1991 his autobiography, Life as Sutch: The Official Autobiography of a Raving Loony (written with Peter Chippindale), was published. In 2005 Graham Sharpe, who had known him since the late 1960s, wrote the first biography, The Man Who Was Screaming Lord Sutch.

Discography

Studio albums 
 Lord Sutch and Heavy Friends, also known as Smoke and Fire (1970), as Lord Sutch and Heavy Friends, with Jimmy Page, John Bonham, Jeff Beck, Noel Redding and Nicky Hopkins – AUS #16, US #84
 Rock & Horror (1982), Ace Records CDCHM 65

Live albums 
 Hands of Jack the Ripper (1972), as Lord Sutch and Heavy Friends, with Ritchie Blackmore, Matthew Fisher, Carlo Little, Keith Moon, Noel Redding and Nick Simper
 Alive and Well (1980)
 Live Manifesto (1992)
 Murder in the Graveyard (1992), as Screaming Lord Sutch and the Undertakers

Compilations 
 Jack the Ripper (1985), Autograph Records ASK 780
 Story/Screaming Lord Sutch & the Savages (1991)
 Raving Loony Party Favourites (1996)

Posthumously released:
 Monster Rock (2000)
 Munster Rock (2001)

Extended plays 
Posthumously released:
 Midnight Man (2000)
 The London Rock & Roll Show DVD

Singles 
 "'Til the Following Night" b/w "Good Golly Miss Molly" (1961)
 "Jack the Ripper" (1963)
 "The Train Kept A-Rollin'" b/w "Honey Hush" (1965)
"Purple People Eater" b/w "You Don't Care" (1966)
"'Cause I Love You" b/w "Thumping Beat" (1970), as Lord Sutch and Heavy Friends
"Election Fever" b/w "Rock the Election" (1970), as Lord Sutch and Heavy Friends
"Gotta Keep A-Rocking" b/w "Country Club" (1972), as Lord Sutch and Heavy Friends

Elections fought 

Notes:-
 1 This election was won by the incumbent Prime Minister.
 2 Sutch achieved a better result than the candidate from the rump SDP.
 3 Sutch achieved a better result than the candidate from the continuing Liberal Party.
 4 Sutch achieved a better result than the joint candidate from the Green Party of England and Wales and Plaid Cymru.
 5 This election was won by the incumbent Leader of the Opposition.
 6 This election was won by the incumbent Leader of the Liberal Democrats.

References 

General
 Chippindale, Peter. "Sutch, David Edward (1940–1999)", Oxford Dictionary of National Biography, Oxford University Press, 2004  
 British Parliamentary Election Results 1950–1973, compiled and edited by F. W. S. Craig (Parliamentary Research Services 1983)
 British Parliamentary Election Results 1974–1983, compiled and edited  by F. W. S. Craig (Parliamentary Research Services 1984)

External links 
 Screaming Lord Sutch and The Savages History
Screaming Lord Sutch - Jack The Ripper (live 1964), YouTube
 Official Radio Sutch
 Interview with and radio profile of Screaming Lord Sutch
 BBC report of Sutch's death
 BBC obituary
 

1940 births
1999 deaths
English radio people
English male singers
Official Monster Raving Loony Party politicians
People from Hampstead
Pirate radio personalities
British politicians who committed suicide
1999 suicides
Suicides by hanging in England
Suicides in Greater London
Leaders of political parties in the United Kingdom
People with bipolar disorder
20th-century English singers
British political candidates
British rock and roll musicians
Screaming Lord Sutch and the Savages members
20th-century British male singers
Lord Sutch and Heavy Friends members
British political party founders